Brashear's Creek is a USGS-classified stream flowing through Shelby and Spencer Counties in Kentucky. It begins at the confluence of Bullskin and Clear Creeks in Shelby County, approximately 2 miles east-northeast of Finchville, Kentucky. It flows approximately 26 miles from its source, through Rivals, to its terminus at Salt River in Taylorsville, Spencer County, Kentucky. 

The stream normally flows year-round, but during prolonged drought, it has been known to stop, with a number of dry spots in shallower areas. Due to its relatively large watershed and surrounding moderately steep terrain, it is also prone to flash flooding and can cut off a number of smaller roads at peak levels.

In its history, Brashear's Creek has served as a source of drinking water for humans and livestock, irrigation water for crops, hydraulic power for mills, fishing and paddling

See also
List of rivers of Kentucky

References 

Rivers of Kentucky
Salt River (Kentucky)